Live at the Lyceum is a live album by The Cult, recorded live at the Lyceum Ballroom in London on 20 May 1984. The band performed 15 songs at the concert, which was edited down to nine songs for this release. In the UK, it was released with the first 30,000 copies of the Dreamtime LP, and also found on side 2 of the Dreamtime cassette. It was released separately as a live LP in Canada and Japan. The live version of "Bone Bag" was released as a videosingle in Argentina.

Track listing
Issued in Canada (PolyGram: LIVE-1) in 1986 as a value-priced album to promote the Dreamtime Live At The Lyceum video:
 A1 "83rd Dream"
 A2 "Gods Zoo"
 A3 "Bad Medicine"
 A4 "Dreamtime"
 B1 "Christians"
 B2 "Horse Nation"
 B3 "Bone Bag"
 B4 "Brothers Grimm"
 B5 "Moya"

This Canadian release is illustrated on the right. In November 1996, it was remastered and the full show released on video and CD. The full track listing of this release is:
 "83rd Dream"
 "Gods Zoo"
 "Gimmick"
 "Bad Medicine Waltz"
 "A Flower in the Desert"
 "Go West (Crazy Spinning Circles)"
 "Butterflies"
 "Dreamtime"
 "Christians"
 "Spiritwalker"
 "Horse Nation"
 "Bone Bag"
 "Ghost Dance"
 "Brothers Grimm"
 "Moya"

Personnel
The Cult
Ian Astbury - vocals
Billy Duffy - guitars
Jamie Stewart - bass guitar
Nigel Preston - drums

References

The Cult albums
1984 live albums
PolyGram live albums